Paddi Matwali  is a village in Shaheed Bhagat Singh Nagar district of Punjab State, India. The village is administrated by Sarpanch an elected representative of the village.

Demography 
As of 2011, Paddi Matwali has a total number of 312 houses and population of 1408 of which 714 include are males while 694 are females according to the report published by Census India in 2011. The literacy rate of Paddi Matwali is 82.58% higher than the state average of 75.84%. The population of children under the age of 6 years is 139 which is 9.87% of total population of Paddi Matwali, and child sex ratio is approximately 986 as compared to Punjab state average of 846.

Most of the people are from Schedule Caste which constitutes 54.05% of total population in Paddi Matwali. The town does not have any Schedule Tribe population so far.

As per the report published by Census India in 2011, 476 people were engaged in work activities out of the total population of Paddi Matwali which includes 404 males and 72 females. According to census survey report 2011, 69.07% workers describe their work as main work and 31.93% workers are involved in Marginal activity providing livelihood for less than 6 months.

Education 
Amardeep Singh Shergill Memorial college Mukandpur, KC Engineering College and Doaba Khalsa Trust Group Of Institutions are the nearest colleges.

List of schools nearby:
Govt Senior Secondary School, Ladhana Jhikka
Dashmesh Model School, Kahma
Govt High School, Jhander Kalan
Govt Gigh School, Khan Khana
Guru Ram Dass Public School, Cheta

Transport 

See also 
List of villages in India

References

External links 
 Tourism of Punjab
 Census of Punjab
 Locality Based PINCode

Villages in Shaheed Bhagat Singh Nagar district